Senegalia manubensis is a species of plant in the family Fabaceae. It is found only in Somalia, and is threatened by habitat loss. Its appearance consists of a small tree with a rounded crown, growing to a maximum of 5 metres tall.

Uses
The plant is gathered from the wild as it contains a gum which can be sold at local markets.

References

manubensis
Vulnerable plants
Endemic flora of Somalia
Taxonomy articles created by Polbot